Rebecca Kamau (born 21 July 1999) is a Kenyan swimmer. She competed in the women's 100 metre breaststroke event at the 2017 World Aquatics Championships. In 2019, she represented Kenya at the 2019 African Games held in Rabat, Morocco and she won the bronze medal in the women's 4 × 100 metre medley relay.

References

1999 births
Living people
Kenyan female swimmers
Female breaststroke swimmers
Commonwealth Games competitors for Kenya
Swimmers at the 2014 Commonwealth Games
Place of birth missing (living people)
African Games bronze medalists for Kenya
Swimmers at the 2015 African Games
Swimmers at the 2019 African Games
African Games medalists in swimming